U.S. Highway 6 (US 6) is an east–west United States Numbered Highway which runs  across the U.S. state of Iowa. The route is signed in places as the Grand Army of the Republic Highway. Like all state highways in Iowa, it is maintained by the Iowa Department of Transportation (Iowa DOT). The route begins at the Missouri River crossing at Council Bluffs. From there, it travels east through Oakland and Atlantic. North of Atlantic, the highway overlaps Interstate 80 (I-80) until De Soto. Between De Soto and Adel, the highway overlaps US 169 before splitting off to the east toward Des Moines.

At Altoona, the route again overlaps I-80 until Newton, where it splits away from I-80. The highway passes near or through the cities of Kellogg, Grinnell, Victor, Marengo, the Amana Colonies, and Tiffin before entering the Iowa City metropolitan area. Through Coralville and Iowa City, US 6 has no direct access to I-80, I-380, or US 218; other routes like Iowa Highway 1 (Iowa 1) and Iowa 965 provide direct access. From Iowa City, the highway heads to the east-southeast through West Liberty and Atalissa. Near Wilton, the route heads north to I-80 where it again overlaps to Davenport. At Davenport, US 6 then follows I-280 and US 61 before entering the city. On the eastern side of Davenport, it joins I-74 and enters Bettendorf before leaving Iowa for Illinois.

Dating back to 1910, the route US 6 follows was originally the Great White Way and River-to-River Road. Both were auto trails which connected Council Bluffs and Davenport. When the U.S. Numbered Highway System was created in 1926, the highway was designated U.S. Highway 32 (US 32). US 32 was renumbered in 1931 as US 6 was extended to the west coast. As the Interstate Highway System expanded in the 1950–1970s, US 6's importance as a cross-state route was diminished by I-80. As a result, the least-traveled sections of the route were moved onto I-80 and control of the vacated sections of highway was given to local jurisdictions.

Route description
US 6 is a cross-state route that connects Council Bluffs and Davenport by way of Des Moines and Iowa City. The route parallels I-80 for most of its length; however, nearly one-third of the route overlaps the Interstate Highway.

Western Iowa
US 6 crosses the Missouri River via the Grenville Dodge Memorial Bridge, named after the Union Army general during the U.S. Civil War, into Council Bluffs with I-480. Just  into the state, I-480 ends at an interchange with I-29. US 6 heads east along I-29 south on the western side of Council Bluffs, then it overlaps I-80 and continues due east. On the east side of Council Bluffs, I-80 and US 6 split. Near Lewis, the road turns to the north-northeast until it reaches Atlantic. In Atlantic, the route turns back to the east and heads toward downtown where it meets Iowa 83. US 6 / Iowa 83 travel together to the eastern side of Atlantic where they meet US 71. At I-80, US 6 leaves US 71 and joins I-80. At this point, US 6 begins the first of three instances when its traffic is routed along I-80. In the eastern part of Cass County, the two routes meet the northern end of Iowa 148.

As I-80 and US 6 approach Adair, the highways curve slightly to the south to bypass the community. There are two interchanges in Adair; both of the intersecting roads, at one time or another, carried US 6. County Road G30 (CR G30), the White Pole Road, was the original alignment of US 6, while CR N54 has not carried US 6 since 1980. Further east is an interchange with Iowa 25. Each year for Memorial Day, the rock is repainted with a patriotic scene by local artist Ray "Bubba" Sorenson II. Near Dexter, I-80 and US 6 graze the northwestern corner of Madison County. After , the routes enter Dallas County and meet CR F60, another former alignment of US 6. Near the CR F90 / CR P58 interchange, they start heading northeast toward Des Moines. At De Soto, US 6 splits away from I-80 at the interchange with US 169.

Central Iowa
Over the next , it serves as the border between Urbandale and Windsor Heights. At 63rd Street in Des Moines, US 6 intersects Iowa 28. For , US 6 / Iowa 28 run together on Hickman Road. Turning north, they run together for another mile along Merle Hay Road, named after the first Iowa service member in World War I. At Douglas Avenue, US 6 splits away from Iowa 28 and continues east, becoming Euclid Avenue just west of the Des Moines River. In north-central Des Moines, it intersects US 69 and I-235. In northeast Des Moines, it turns to the northeast along Hubbell Avenue, which takes US 6 to Altoona. West of Altoona, it intersects US 65 and continues northeast passing the Adventureland theme park and Prairie Meadows casino. In northwest Altoona, US 6 intersects I-80 and US 65. Here, US 6 rejoins I-80 for the second time. After a third exit for Altoona, the Interstate resumes its  rural limit. Near Colfax, the highways cross the South Skunk River. After an interchange with Iowa 117, the highway is forced to the north to avoid crossing the river multiple times. As the roadway returns south to its original line, it meets CR F48, which was another former alignment of US 6.

At Newton, US 6 splits away from I-80 at the Iowa 14 interchange. It turns off of Iowa 14 and enters the western side of Newton where it passes the Jasper County courthouse located in the downtown area. Between Newton and Grinnell, the route has more hills and curves. The highway crosses the North Skunk River near Kellogg. At Grinnell, it intersects Iowa 146 southwest of the Grinnell College campus. Near Victor, US 6 takes a northeasterly course through Ladora toward Marengo. At Marengo, it intersects the eastern end of Iowa 212.  east of Marengo is the western end of Iowa 20. US 6 heads to the southeast toward Tiffin and passes underneath I-380 but does not have direct access.

Eastern Iowa
At Coralville, US 6 passes underneath I-80, but  to the east, Coral Ridge Avenue provides direct access to I-80. Entering Iowa City, the highway passes the campus of the University of Iowa, its main hospital, and VA Hospital. From Iowa City, it heads in an east-southeast direction toward West Liberty. The highway enters West Liberty from the northwest corner and curves southward. At the northern end of Iowa 70, it turns to the east again toward Atalissa and Wilton. At the Wilton interchange along I-80, Iowa 38 turns west and US 6 turns east onto the Interstate, respectively.

Just within the city limits of Davenport is the I-280 interchange. US 6 exits to the south to join I-280. US 61 also joins I-280 at this interchange but from the opposite direction. US 6 only overlaps I-280 / US 61 for  before exiting onto Kimberly Road. At Fairmount Street, it becomes a four-lane divided highway and straightens out to head due east. Near NorthPark Mall, it intersects Northwest Boulevard, which becomes Iowa 130 at I-80, and both one-way legs, Welcome Way southbound and Brady Street northbound, of US 61 Business, which, prior to 2010, was US 61. US 6 briefly dips to the southeast and straightens out again toward I-74. The highway joins I-74 and heads to the south toward Moline, Illinois. The two routes completely enter Bettendorf and descend into the Mississippi River valley, where they meet US 67 at a complex series of exit and entrance ramps. They then ascend the Iowa–Illinois Memorial Bridge, known locally as the I-74 Bridge, and cross the Mississippi River into Illinois.

History

Before the U.S. Numbered Highway System came into being in 1926, roads in Iowa were maintained and promoted by local organizations which sought to drive traffic into their communities. Two such organizations created virtually parallel routes connecting Council Bluffs and Davenport via Des Moines. The routes, the southern Great White Way and northern River-to-River Road, eventually merged into the Whiteway-7-Highway. The new route followed the Great White Way from Council Bluffs to Des Moines and the River-to-River Road from Des Moines to Davenport. In 1926, the Whiteway-7-Highway became US 32, which itself became US 6 in 1931. For a time, US 6 was the busiest highway in the state. After I-80 was built near US 6, portions of the U.S. Highway were moved onto the Interstate Highway. Interest in the original US 6 corridor has grown in the 21st century by people who seek to drive traffic back into their communities.

Great White Way/White Pole Road

The Great White Way was formed in 1910 by the White Pole Auto Club. The route was built along the Chicago, Rock Island and Pacific Railroad between Council Bluffs and Des Moines. Members of the auto club painted poles along the route white, which lead the route to be known as the White Pole Road. The Great White Way passed through Oakland, Atlantic, Adair, De Soto, and Valley Junction. In late 1912, the Great White Way was extended east to Davenport, passing through Pella, Oskaloosa, Washington, and Muscatine. When the primary highway system was created, the Great White Way was assigned Primary Road No. 2.

In 2002, a group of residents from Adair, Casey, Menlo, Stuart, and Dexter formed a new group to promote the White Pole Road. Their intention was to bring visitors to their towns by diverting some traffic from the nearby I-80 / US 6 corridor to the south and onto the historic road. White Pole Road logo signs in each town give a short history of the town and their founders.

River-to-River Road

The River-to-River Road (RRR) was also created in 1910 and also connected Council Bluffs and Davenport via Des Moines. This route, however, traveled a more northern route than the Great White Way. The route passed through Neola, Elk Horn, Guthrie Center, Adel, Des Moines, Newton, Marengo, Iowa City, and Wilton. The route's origins trace back to the 1909–1910 winter season which brought, on average,  of snow more than the previous year, which was followed by an unusually dry spring. Coupled with the advent of the Ford Model T, many Iowans complained about the lack of good roads in the state. Governor Beryl F. Carroll convened a Good Roads convention on March 8–9, 1910, to discuss the condition of roads in his state. It was then that the route of the RRR was decided among the convention delegates. Further influencing the RRR corridor was an announcement from the American Automobile Association that the annual Glidden Tour would pass through Iowa. Governor Carroll arranged for farmers who lived along the route to drag all  of the road on the Saturday prior to the tour's arrival at precisely 9:00 am.  Work was finished in one hour.

When the highway commission started accepting registered routes, the RRR association planned to register their route as soon as possible. But miscommunication between association members and with the highway commission delayed the actual registration for years. The route became official on April 16, 1918. When the primary highway system was created, the RRR was assigned Primary Road No. 7.

Whiteway-7-Highway

The Whiteway-7-Highway was registered by the Whiteway-7-Highway Association filing an application in 1922 with the Iowa State Highway Commission. The commission was concerned with the Whiteway-7-Highway's similarity to the Great White Way's name and route markings. The Great White Way was marked with a  stripe, while the Whiteway-7-Highway would be marked with a  stripe with a black circle containing a white seven. Another concern with the new route was since its name contained the number seven, the route would be assigned along Primary Road Nos. 2 and 7. On September 25, 1922, the highway commission gave the Great White Way from Des Moines to Council Bluffs, which would become part of the Whiteway-7-Highway, the number 7 and gave the RRR's western half number 2. Eight months later, the Iowa State Highway Commission reversed course and restored Primary Road Nos. 2 and 7 to their original roadways. Although disappointed, the Whiteway-7-Highway Association responded by removing the number from their name. On November 27, 1925, the route officially became the Whiteway Highway.

U.S. Numbered Highways

On November 11, 1926, members of the American Association of State Highway Officials approved the plan to create a system of interstate highways across the country. Iowa's Whiteway Highway would take on the designation of US 32. For four-and-a-half years, US 32 spanned from Chicago to Council Bluffs. Meanwhile, Roosevelt Highway Association was pushing to have US 6 extended westward. On June 8, 1931, all of the Iowa portion of US 32 was absorbed into a newly extended US 6, which had previously connected Erie, Pennsylvania, and Cape Cod, Massachusetts. The new US 6 also replaced US 38 in Nebraska and Colorado. By the end of 1937, US 6 extended from coast to coast. At the time, it and US 30 were the only cross country highways to bear a single route number across the country.

When the last segment of highway between Adel and Des Moines was paved in 1931, US 6 became the fourth paved road to cross the state. In the early 1940s, US 6 was the most heavily traveled route in the state. The state highway commission recorded that, on average, over 1,900 vehicles used the road per day at any rural point. That compares to nearly 3,000 vehicles using US 6 daily in 2012.

On April 29, 1947, the Iowa General Assembly approved an act designating US 6 as the Grand Army of the Republic Highway, a distinction the route shares in other states. Governor Robert D. Blue dedicated the Grand Army of the Republic Highway at the Iowa Old Capitol Building on September 28, 1947. In attendance were the last two surviving Iowa veterans of the U.S. Civil War. In the 1950s, the Iowa State Highway Commission began to straighten the route. A section of the highway between Grinnell and Ladora was straightened, which resulted in Brooklyn and Victor being bypassed. Between Dexter and West Des Moines, US 6 swapped alignments with Iowa 90 in 1958. In 1961, US 6 was routed onto the new I-80 from the Iowa 90 interchange to the Baxter exit, currently exit 159. Iowa 90 was extended onto the old US 6 alignment. However, in 1967, those changes were reversed and US 6 was taken off I-80 and put back on the road which had been Iowa 90. Iowa 90 was assigned the section of US 6 between what's now exit 106 along I-80 and exit 69 along I-35.

Abandoned sections
Since the 1970s, portions of US 6 have been moved permanently onto I-80. The first section, between US 71 and Adair, was rerouted in 1972. The abandoned section became an extended Iowa 83 and CR G30 in Adair County. All three sections were originally kept as state highways, but, in 1991, when Iowa DOT first showed the new state highways' designations on the state highway map, the central section already had been turned over to Polk and Jasper counties. The western segment was numbered Iowa 925 and the eastern segment Iowa 927.

On July 1, 2003,  between Dexter and Adel were turned over to Dallas County. US 6, which had previously split away from I-80 at the Dexter exit, was continued along I-80 to the US 169 interchange at De Soto, and then along US 169 to Adel. The former segments, Iowa 925 and Iowa 927, were turned over to their respective counties as well.

Major intersections

References

External links

Iowa division of the U.S. Route 6 Tour Association
The White Pole Road
River to River: Iowa's Forgotten Highway 6

 Iowa
06
Transportation in Pottawattamie County, Iowa
Transportation in Cass County, Iowa
Transportation in Adair County, Iowa
Transportation in Madison County, Iowa
Transportation in Dallas County, Iowa
Transportation in Polk County, Iowa
Transportation in Jasper County, Iowa
Transportation in Poweshiek County, Iowa
Transportation in Iowa County, Iowa
Transportation in Johnson County, Iowa
Transportation in Muscatine County, Iowa
Transportation in Cedar County, Iowa
Transportation in Scott County, Iowa